Jack Arnold (born ) was an Australian rugby league footballer who played in the New South Wales Rugby Football League premiership.

Playing career
Arnold played for the Western Suburbs (making his debut in the 1936 season as the second youngest debutant in rugby league history at 16 years of age), and Eastern Suburbs during his career.  He had just the one season at Wests before joining Eastern Suburbs in 1938 where he played over 10 matches, remaining there until his retirement in 1949.

Arnold was a member of the Easts' side that won premierships in 1940 and 1945, he was Also a member of the side that went down to St George in 1941, that club's first premiership.

Arnold, a front-rower, had the reputation of being a hard no-nonsense forward. He was sent-off in Easts' 1941 premiership defeat, But was a try-scorer in Easts' 22-18 premiership victory over Balmain in 1945, sealing the victory with the only points, that day, Dick Dunn didn't score for East's in the match. Arnold was one of 4 captains Easts' were to use during the 1948 season. 

Outside of rugby league Arnold was a member of the local fire brigade.

References

The Encyclopedia of Rugby League Players, Alan Whiticker & Glen Hudson
The NSW Rugby League Finals, Steve Haddan

1920s births
Possibly living people
Australian firefighters
Australian rugby league players
Western Suburbs Magpies players
Sydney Roosters players
Year of birth uncertain
Place of birth missing (living people)
Rugby league players from New South Wales